Taft Building may refer to:

in the United States
(by state)
Taft Building (Los Angeles), a historic building
Taft Brothers Block, Uxbridge, Massachusetts
Timothy J. McCarthy Building, Faribault, Minnesota, also known as Taft Building
The Michelangelo, also known as Taft Hotel building, New York City

See also
Taft School (disambiguation)
Taft House (disambiguation)
Taft Homes
Lorado Taft Midway Studios, Chicago, Illinois